Dato' Haji Muhamad Sharip bin Haji Othman, DTNS, 11th Dato' Lela Maharaja (born 14 August 1941 at Chembong Kecil, Rembau), is the 21st and current Undang of Luak Rembau. 

Muhamad is a direct descendant of the Dato' Lela Maharaja Suku Biduanda, of the Waris Nan Dua Carak (Perut Tebat) a sub-clan of the Biduanda clan. He is the head of the Waris Jakun lineage (who hold the hereditary title of Dato' Lela Maharaja); the other noble lineage of Rembau is the Waris Jawa (who hold the hereditary title of Dato' Sedia di-Raja). He was elected and installed as the Undang of Rembau on 21 November 1998. Although officially elected by the nobles of the state, the throne of the Undang alternates between the heads of the two noble houses.

References

1941 births
Living people
People from Negeri Sembilan
Royal House of Negeri Sembilan
Malaysian people of Minangkabau descent
Malaysian Muslims